Mi'ma'amakim ( / "Out of the Depths") is the second album by The Idan Raichel Project, released in 2005 in Israel.

The first and last tracks on the album feature the popular late Israeli singer Shoshana Damari.

In addition to more catchy tunes in Hebrew and Amharic, Raichel adds Arabic (in "Azini"), Zulu (in "Siyaishaya Ingoma"), Hindi (in "Milim Yafot Me'ele"), and Yemenite Hebrew to his linguistic repertoire.

Track listing
 "Aleh Nisa' Baru'ach" (2:48) עלה נישא ברוח
 "Be'yom Shabat" (3:33) ביום שבת
 "Shuvi El Beti" (3:54) שובי אל ביתי
 "Yesh Bi Od Ko'ach" (3:09) יש בי עוד כוח
 "Mi'ma'amakim" (5:50) ממעמקים
 "Im Tachpetza" (3:59) אם תחפצה
 "Milim Yafot Me'eleh" (4:46) מילים יפות מאלה
 "Mikol Ha'ahavot" (4:22) מכל האהבות
 "Ulai Hapa'am" (2:40) אולי הפעם
 "Azini" (4:27) عزين
 "Ein Li Terutsim" (3:16) אין לי תירוצים
 "Siyaishaya Ingoma" (3:34)
 "Ha'er Et Einav" (2:49) האר את עיניו

Reception
The album was certified 3× Platinum in Israel.

2005 albums
Idan Raichel albums
Helicon Records albums